Jewsbury is a surname. Notable people with the surname include: 

Geraldine Jewsbury (1812–1880), English novelist
George Jewsbury (born 1941), American historian
Jack Jewsbury (born 1981), American soccer player
Maria Jane Jewsbury (1800–1833), English novelist

See also
Dewsbury (disambiguation)